Howard Taylor Ricketts (February 9, 1871 – May 3, 1910) was an American pathologist after whom the family Rickettsiaceae and the order Rickettsiales are named.

He was born in Findlay, Ohio.  In the early part of his career, Ricketts undertook research at Northwestern University on blastomycosis. He later worked in the Bitterroot Valley of Montana and at the University of Chicago on Rocky Mountain spotted fever.  This early pathology, entomology and epidemiology research in Hamilton, Montana lead to the eventual formation of the Rocky Mountain Laboratories there.

While in Montana, Ricketts and his assistant discovered that the vector that carried the pathogen for Rocky Mountain spotted fever is a tick, the Rocky Mountain wood tick (Dermacentor andersoni; some other species of ticks, such as the American dog or wood tick, Dermacentor variabilis, also are vectors). It was not at once clear what kind of organism the pathogen was; eventually it was named Rickettsia, the first of the Rickettsiales to be identified. However, for decades, until electron microscopy and other technologies became sufficiently advanced, it was not known whether Rickettsiales were bacteria, viruses, or something in between. They now are known to be bacteria specialised for intracellular parasitism.

Ricketts was devoted to his research and, on several occasions, injected himself with pathogens to study their effects. The pathogen causing Rocky Mountain spotted fever, Rickettsia rickettsii was named after him. After this eponymous genus, the larger family and order were given their names.

In 1910, Ricketts became interested in a strain of murine-carried typhus known as tabardillo due to a major outbreak in Mexico City, and the apparent similarity of the disease to spotted fever. Days after isolating the organism that he believed caused typhus, he himself died of the disease. His last papers were written in collaboration with R. M. Wilder.

Ricketts was survived by his wife, Myra Tubbs Ricketts, and children.  His family established an annual student research prize, the Howard Taylor Ricketts Prize, at the University of Chicago in 1912. Noteworthy recipients of the Ricketts Prize include Julian Herman Lewis (1913), Lauretta Bender (1923), Sara Elizabeth Branham (1924), G. M. Dack (1925), and Maurice Hilleman (1945).

References

Further reading

External links
 
 
 
Guide to the Howard Taylor Ricketts Papers 1891-1977 at the University of Chicago Special Collections Research Center

American pathologists
Deaths from typhus
1871 births
1910 deaths
Rickettsiales
People from Findlay, Ohio
Northwestern University alumni
University of Chicago faculty